Berneri is a surname. Notable people with the surname include:

 Anahí Berneri (born 1975), Argentine director and movie producer
 Camillo Berneri (1877–1937), Italian professor
 Giliana Berneri (1919–1998), French libertarian communist activist
 Giovanna Berneri (1897–1962), educationalist and militant libertarian anarchist
 Marie-Louise Berneri (1918-1949), Italian anarchist